Christ the King Church may refer to:

Denominations 
 Protestant Church of Christ the King, an African Reformed denomination

Buildings and congregations

Australia 
 Church of Christ the King, Tennant Creek, Northern Territory
 Catholic Church of Christ the King, Taralga, New South Wales

China 
 Christ the King Church, Shenzhen

Denmark 
 Christ the King Church, Nuuk, Greenland

Iceland 
 Christ the King Cathedral (Reykjavík)

India 
 Christ the King Church, Jog Falls, Karnataka

Latvia 
 Christ the King Church, Riga

Malta 
 Christ the King Church, Paola

Nauru 
 Christ the King Church, Arubo

Russia 
 Christ the King Church, Marks

Sweden 
 Christ the King Church, Gothenburg

Uganda 
 Christ the King Catholic Church, Kampala

United Kingdom 
 Church of Christ the King, Bloomsbury, London
 Christ the King Church, Wimbledon Park, London
 Church of Christ the King, Birkenhead, Merseyside

United States 
 Christ the King Church (Fort Smith, Arkansas)
 Christ the King Church (Larkspur, Colorado), designated an anti-LGBT hate group by the Southern Poverty Law Center
 Christ the King Church (Trumbull, Connecticut)
 Christ the King School and Church, Lexington, listed on the National Register of Historic Places in Kentucky
 Christ the King Presbyterian Church, Cambridge, Massachusetts
 Christ the King Parish, Ludlow, Massachusetts
 Christ the King's Church (Bronx, New York)

See also 
 Christ the King Cathedral (disambiguation)